Live at Madison Square Garden may refer to:

 Live at Madison Square Garden (Bon Jovi album), released in 2009
 Live at Madison Square Garden (Shawn Mendes album), released in 2016
 Live at Madison Square Garden 1978, by Jethro Tull
 Aziz Ansari: Live at Madison Square Garden, released in 2015
 Phish: New Year's Eve 1995 – Live at Madison Square Garden, released in 2005

See also
 Live from Madison Square Garden (disambiguation)
 Madison Square Garden, eponymous venue